The 2022 KBS Drama Awards, presented by Korean Broadcasting System (KBS), was held on December 31, 2022, from 21:20 (KST) at KBS Hall in Yeouido, Seoul. It was hosted by Jeon Hyun-moo, Lee Hye-ri and Jung Yong-hwa.

Joo Sang-wook and Lee Seung-gi won the grand prize (Daesang) for their performances in The King of Tears, Lee Bang-won and The Law Cafe respectively.

Winners and nominees

Presenters

Special performances

See also
 2022 SBS Drama Awards
 2022 MBC Drama Awards

References

External links 
  
 

Korean Broadcasting System original programming
2022 television awards
KBS Drama Awards
December 2022 events in South Korea
2022 in South Korean television